The  2008 Beijing Guoan F.C. season  was their 5th consecutive season in the Chinese Super League, established in 2004, and 18th consecutive season in the top flight of Chinese football. They competed at the Chinese Super League and AFC Champions League.

First team
As of March 27, 2008

Friendlies

Competitions

Chinese Super League

Matches

AFC Champions League

Group stage

References

Beijing Guoan F.C. seasons
Chinese football clubs 2008 season